County Laois is a county in Ireland. It is part of the Eastern and Midland Region and in the province of Leinster. It was known as Queen's County from 1556 to 1922. The modern county takes its name from Loígis, a medieval kingdom. Historically, it has also been known as County Leix.

Laois County Council is the local authority for the county. At the 2022 census, the population of the county was 91,657, an increase of 56% since the 2002 census.

History

Prehistoric
The first people in Laois were bands of hunters and gatherers who passed through the county about 8,500 years ago. They hunted in the forests that covered Laois and fished in its rivers, gathering nuts and berries to supplement their diets.

Next came Ireland's first farmers. These people of the Neolithic period (4000 to 2500 BC) cleared forests and planted crops. Their burial mounds remain in Clonaslee and Cuffsborough.

Starting around 2500 BC, the people of the Bronze Age lived in Laois. They produced weapons, tools and golden objects. Visitors to the county can see a stone circle they left behind at Monamonry, as well as the remains of their hill forts at Clopook and Monelly. Skirk, near Borris-in-Ossory, has a Bronze Age standing stone and ring fort. The body of Cashel Man indicates that ritual killing took place around 2000 BC.

The next stage is known as the pre-Christian Celtic Iron Age. For the first time, iron appeared in Ireland, showing up in the weapons used by factions who fought bloody battles for control of the land. At Ballydavis, archaeologists have discovered ring barrows that date from this time period.

The county name derives from Loígis, of which the modern county is only a part. In the 11th century, its dynastic rulers adopted the surname Ua/Ó Mórdha. They claimed descent from a member of the Red Branch Knights.

By the first century AD, the western third of Laois was part of the Kingdom of Ossory. The eastern part was divided roughly into seven parts, which were ruled by the Seven Septs of Loígis: O’More (O’Moore), O’Lalor, O’Doran, O’Dowling, O’Devoy (O’Deevy), O’Kelly and McEvoy.

Introduction of Christianity
When Ireland was Christianised, holy men and women founded religious communities in Loígis.  St. Ciarán of Saighir (called "The Elder" to distinguish him from the younger St. Ciarán of Clonmacnoise) founded his monastic habitation in the western Slieve Bloom Mountains as the first bishop of Ossory, reputedly before St. Patrick.  His mother Liadán had an early convent nearby at what is now Killyon.  Between 550 and 600, St. Canice founded Aghaboe Abbey and St. Mochua founded a religious community at Timahoe. An early Christian community lived at Dun Masc or Masc's fort, on the Rock of Dunamase.

The Synod of Rathbreasail that established the Irish dioceses was held near Mountrath in 1111, moving the Church away from its monastic base. As religious orders with strong ties to Rome replaced older religious communities, the wooden buildings of the early Christian churches in Laois gave way to stone monasteries. The Augustinians and Dominicans established themselves at Aghaboe Abbey, while the Cistercians took over an older religious community at Abbeyleix.

Norman invasion
The Norman invasion of Ireland in 1169–71 affected Laois as it was a part of the Kingdom of Leinster. In Laois, the fortress on the Rock of Dunamase was part of the dowry of the Irish princess Aoife, who was given in marriage in 1170 to the Norman warrior Strongbow. Advancing Normans surveyed the county from wooden towers built on top of earthen mounds, known as mottes. They also built stone fortresses, such as Lea Castle, just outside Portarlington. Several of the county's towns were first established as Norman boroughs, including Castletown, Durrow and Timahoe.

From 1175 until about 1325, Normans controlled the best land in the county, while Gaelic society retreated to the bogs, forests and the Slieve Bloom Mountains. The early 14th century saw a Gaelic revival, as the chieftains of Loígis caused the Normans to withdraw. The Dempseys seized Lea Castle, while Dunamase came into the ownership of the O’Mores. Examples of tower houses built by the Irish Mac Giolla Phádraig chieftains are found at Ballaghmore and Cullahill Castle, both decorated with Sheela na gigs.

In 1548, the English confiscated the lands of the O’Mores and built "Campa", known as the Fort of Leix, today's Portlaoise.

16th century colony and County status

It was shired in 1556 by Queen Mary as Queen's County, covering the countries of Leix (Loígis), Slewmarge, Irry, and that part of Glimnaliry on the southwest side of the River Barrow. Laois received its present Irish language name following the Irish War of Independence. Laois was also sometimes spelt "Leix". Portlaoise (previously Maryborough) is the main town of the county.

Loígis was the subject of two organised plantations or colonisations by the Kingdom of England in 1556 and 1607. During the first plantation, Thomas Radclyffe, 3rd Earl of Sussex attempted to dispossess the ruling O'Moore clan, who had been engaging in costly raids on The Pale, and settle the area with English colonists. However, this led to a long drawn-out guerrilla war in the county and left only a small colonist community clustered around garrisons. This initial attempt at plantation is widely regarded as a failure by historians, as occupying the territory was far more costly than the money yielded from it, and the scheme attracted fewer settlers than anticipated. 

The second, more successful plantation of the county took place in the aftermath of the Nine Years' War, and expanded the existing English settlements with more landowners and tenants. In 1659, a group of Quakers led by William Edmundson, settled in Mountmellick, while a group of Huguenots were given refuge in Portarlington in 1696 after their service to William of Orange in the Williamite War in Ireland.

What followed was a period of relative calm. Anglo-Irish landowners enclosed the land and built fine houses, including Durrow Castle, Heywood House and Emo Court. In 1836, a branch of the Grand Canal stretched to Mountmellick, further stimulating industry in that town.

The Great Famine of 1845–49 devastated the county. The county's workhouses could not cope with the number of destitute people seeking shelter. By the time the workhouse opened at Donaghmore in 1853, many of the poorest had emigrated or died.

The county was known as Queen's County from 1556 until its name was informally changed on the establishment of the Irish Free State in 1922. The county's name was formerly spelt as Laoighis and Leix. In the Local Government Act 2001, it is named in the list of counties as Laois, although no legislation was enacted explicitly changing the name from Queen's County, the name formally established under the Local Government (Ireland) Act 1898 which continued to have legal effect. When land is sold in the county the relevant title deeds are still updated as being in Queen's County.

Geography and subdivisions

Laois is the 23rd in both in area and population of Ireland's 32 counties. It is the seventh-largest of Leinster's 12 counties in size and tenth largest in population. The county is landlocked and, uniquely, is doubly landlocked, not bordering any other county which touches the coast.

Baronies
The county was formerly divided into nine baronies:

Ballyadams
Cullenagh
Maryborough East
Maryborough West
Portnehinch
Slievemargue
Stradbally
Tinnehinch
Upper Ossory (later divided into Upper Woods, Clarmallagh and Clandonagh)

Towns and villages

 Abbeyleix
 Aghaboe
 Arles
 Ballacolla
 Ballaghmore
 Ballickmoyler
 Ballinakill
 Ballybrittas
 Ballybrophy
 Ballyhide
 Ballyfin
 Ballylinan
 Ballyroan
 Barrowhouse
 Borris-in-Ossory
Camross
 Castletown
 Clonaslee
 Coolrain
 Cullohill
 Donaghmore
 Durrow
 Emo
 Errill
 The Heath
 Jamestown
 Killeshin
 Mountmellick
 Mountrath
 Newtown
 Pike of Rushall
 Portarlington
 Portlaoise
 Rathdowney
 Rosenallis
 Shanahoe
 Stradbally
 The Swan
 Timahoe
 Vicarstown

Climate
For climatological information see: durrow.ie for averages and extremes.

The weather station at east Durrow was set up in May 2008. The equipment used is a Davis Vantage Pro II that measures temperature, humidity, wind speed, wind direction, rainfall and barometric pressure. This data is transmitted every 2 seconds to a website where the data can be freely accessed. The station also reports to the Irish Weather Network which displays live weather data from similar stations all around Ireland.
 
In addition, a Met Éireann climatological station (Number: 472) was installed in September 2010 and the data collected is sent to headquarters in Glasnevin, Dublin on a monthly basis. The climatological station measures rainfall in a manual gauge, soil temperatures at 5  cm, 10  cm and 20  cm depths, air temperature including wet-bulb, and daily maximum and daily minimum temperatures. The climatological station is a project that is envisaged to last thirty years and collect a climate profile for Durrow and Laois in general.

Governance and politics

Local government

Laois County Council is the local authority governing County Laois. It has 19 councillors, and is divided into three local electoral areas, each of which is also a municipal district: Borris-in-Ossory-Mountmellick (6), Graiguecullen-Portarlington (6), and Portlaoise (7).

The council has two representatives on the Eastern and Midland Regional Assembly.

Former districts
It was formerly divided into the rural districts of Abbeyleix, Athy No. 2, Mountmellick, Roscrea No. 3, and Slievemargy. The rural districts were abolished in 1925. Mountmellick and Portlaoise, within the former rural district of Mountmellick, had town commissioners. These became town councils in 2002. All town councils in Ireland were abolished in 2014.

National politics
Most of County Laois is part of the Dáil constituency of Laois–Offaly (5 seats), with the electoral divisions of Ballybrittas, Jamestown, Kilmullen, Portarlington South, in the former rural district of Mountmellick, in the Kildare South constituency. The constituency of Laois–Offaly existed from 1921 to 2016, and again since 2020. In 2016 to 2020 period, there was a separate constituency of Laois (3 seats).

It is part of the European Parliament constituency of South (5 seats).

Places of interest

Slieve Bloom Mountains
Rock of Dunamase
Emo Court
Castle Durrow
Timahoe Round Tower
Stradbally Hall
Mountmellick Quaker Museum
Ballyfin House
Roundwood House
Dunamaise Arts Centre, Portlaoise
Portlaoise Leisure Centre
Tinnakill Castle
18-hole golf courses include Abbeyleix Road in Portlaoise; The Heritage in Killenard; The Heath; Abbeyleix, Mountrath and Rathdowney.

County Laois also has a mixture of castles, mansions, forts and old structures that are now in ruins but are still worth visiting.

Demography
The population of County Laois is expanding, given its easy commute to the employment centres of Kildare and Dublin. Laois's population growth during the period 2002–2006 (14%) was stronger than the national average (8.2%), as follows:
2002 ... 58,774
2006 ... 67,012 ... +14.01%
2011 ... 80,559
2016 ... 84,697

As of the 2016 census, ethnically Laois was 84% white Irish, 8% other white, 2% black, 1% Asian, 1% 'other', with 3% not stated.

Economy
Industrial parks are located in Portlaoise, Portarlington and Mountmellick. The county receives EU funding as it is part of the cluster of three regions (Border, Midland and West), colloquially known as "BMW", that qualifies for special funding aid. 

Agricultural activities occupy approximately 70% of the land area of the county. However agriculture's share of income in the "BMW" region has declined sharply in the past decade, and represented only approximately 3.9% of annual income (GVA) in 2005 Central Statistics Office. The remaining area includes considerable stretches of raised bog and the Slieve Bloom mountains, which are partially covered by coniferous forest.

Culture

Performing arts
The county's largest theatre is the Dunamaise Theatre in Portlaoise which opened in 1999.
There are many festivals held in Laois each year including:

Durrow Die-Cast Model and Toy Show
Halloween Howls
Laois Bealtaine Festival
Half Door Club Music & Set Dance Festival
Rose of Tralee Regional Finals
Laois Fleadh
Heartlands Rally
Gordon Bennett Classic Car Run
Laois Walks Festival
Festival Francais Portarlington
Durrow Scarecrow Festival
Stradbally National Steam Rally
National Ploughing Championships
Electric Picnic
Maureen Culleton Festival of Dance
B.A.R.E in the Woods
Fisherstown Trad Festival
Ossory Agricultural Show
William Edmundson & Friends Gathering
Mountmellick Drama Festival
Laois International Golf Challenge

Media

Newspapers
The Laois Voice

Railways
Iarnród Éireann train services along the Dublin-Cork line connects the county between Heuston station and Cork, Limerick, travel through the county, with railway stations at Portarlington, Portlaoise and Ballybrophy. From Portarlington trains run on the Dublin-Galway/Westport/Ballina line to Athlone as well as Galway, Westport and Ballina. From Ballybrophy trains run on the Ballybrophy line to Nenagh and Limerick direct.

Road transport
The M7 road runs through County Laois. This is one of the busiest roadways in Ireland connecting Dublin and Limerick and acts as part of the route for the M8 which connects Cork to Dublin. The M8 joins the M7 to the south of Portlaoise. Road infrastructure has improved greatly in the county over the past decade. Most major interurban routes through Laois have now been upgraded to motorway standards. All major traffic bottlenecks in Laois such as Abbeyleix and Mountrath have been bypassed following the opening of the M7/M8 tolled motorway project in May 2010. Both towns were major intercity bottlenecks for motorists, especially Abbeyleix where delays of up to 30 minutes or more were common.

Bus Éireann provides regular intercity bus services in the county. The Dublin to Limerick service runs every hour through towns and villages on the old N7 road (now R445) while the Dublin to Cork intercity bus service runs every two hours through towns in the county.

People
John George Adair (1823–1885), builder of Glenveagh Castle and financier of JA Ranch in the Texas Panhandle.
Darina Allen (1953– ), TV chef.
John Barrett (1753–1821), Vice Provost, Trinity College, 1807–1821.
Sir Jonah Barrington (1760–1834).
Elizabeth Barton of the Barton Family, Straffan and Lisduff
Claire Byrne (1976– ), TV presenter/newscaster, best known for co-presenting RTÉ's The Daily Show
Tony Byrne, former professional footballer who played for Ireland.
Des Connolly, footballer
William Cosby, governor of New York from 1732 to 1736.
Evelyn Cusack, Met Éireann meteorologist
William Dargan (1799–1867), responsible for the Industrial Exhibition, 1853.
Cecil Day-Lewis (1904–1972), British Poet-Laureate, 1967–1972.
Dr. Daniel Delany (1747–1814), Bishop of Kildare and Leighlin.
Eileen Dunne (1958– ), TV newscaster.
Denis Dynon, recipient of the Victoria Cross
Oliver J. Flanagan (1920–1987), Minister for Defence, 1976–1977.
Charles Flanagan
Seán Fleming
Ger Connolly
Stephen Hunt (1981–), professional footballer playing for Wolverhampton Wanderers and Ireland.
Liam Hyland
James Fintan Lalor (1807–1849), Young Irelander.
Peter Lalor (1827–1889), leader of the Eureka Stockade miners revolt, Ballarat, Victoria, Australia.
Patrick Lalor
Charles McDonald
James Macauley (1889–1945), former Ireland soccer international player.
Dr. Bartholomew Mosse (1712–1759), founder, Rotunda Maternity Hospital, Dublin.
David Murphy, Laois Gaelic footballer
Valentine O'Hara (1875–1945), author and authority on Russia and the Baltic states.
Kevin O'Higgins (1892–1927), TD and Minister for Justice.
Sean O'Rourke, broadcaster and journalist with RTÉ.
Bernard O'Shea, comedian, best known for his roles on RTÉ's Republic of Telly.
Brian Rigney, former Ireland rugby international.
Robin Roe (1928–2010), 19 times capped Irish rugby international who also played for the British and Irish Lions.
Hon. William Russell Grace (1832–1904), mayor of New York, 1880–1885.
John Shaw (1773–1823), U.S. Naval Officer.
Robert Sheehan (1988– ), actor best known for playing Nathan Young on E4's comedy-drama, Misfits.
Brian Stanley
Kivas Tully (1820–1905), architect, Trinity College, Toronto, the Custom House and the Bank of Montreal.
Zach Tuohy (1989–), professional Australian rules footballer, currently playing for Geelong Football Club.
Colm Begley (1986–), Gaelic football player. He played Australian rules football for the Brisbane Lions in the AFL.
 Professor Noel Fitzpatrick (1967–), Veterinary Surgeon for Channel 4 television series The Supervet.
Fionn mac Cumhaill, mythical hunter-warrior of Irish mythology
Damien Bowe, singer and former member of Irish boyband D-Side.
Anne Keenan-Buckley (1962–), a middle-distance runner who was on the Irish 1988 Summer Olympic team.
John Whelan (Irish politician)

Sport

Laois has a strong tradition of Gaelic games, with success at both Gaelic football and hurling. Laois are one of few counties to contest an All-Ireland final in both Gaelic football and hurling. In the 21st century, Laois have been more successful footballers than hurlers. Laois minors have had several successes over the past two decades, and the Laois senior footballers reached the Leinster final in 2003 (victorious), 2004, and 2005. As of 2022, Laois hurlers compete in the Liam MacCarthy Cup, a competition reserved for the premiere hurling counties while the footballers compete in the Sam Maguire Cup. Laois play home games at O'Moore Park, the county's largest sporting venue, which is often used for hurling championship games.

In rugby, Portlaoise RFC and Portarlington RFC compete in Division 2A of the Leinster League.

Twin towns
County Laois is a participant in the Twin Towns program and has a relationship with the following municipalities:

 Arlington, Massachusetts, United States
 Carleton Place, Ontario, Canada (2008)
 Coulounieix-Chamiers, France (1996)
 Franklin, Tennessee, United States (2008)

See also 
 List of abbeys and priories in the Republic of Ireland (County Laois)
 List of towns and villages in Ireland
 Lord Lieutenant of Queen's County
 High Sheriff of Queen's County

References

External links 

 
Laois Tourism Website
Official website of Laois County Council
Things to do in Laois – Tourist guide
Map of castles, fortified houses and ruins in Laois

 
Leinster
Counties of the Republic of Ireland
States and territories established in 1556
Local government areas of the Republic of Ireland
1556 establishments in Ireland